Agoraios Kolonos (meaning "the hill next to the Agora"), located to the south and adjacently situated on a hill near the Temple of Hephaestus, used to be the meeting place of the ancient Athenian craftsmen.

See also
 Ancient Agora of Athens

References

Ancient Agora of Athens
Hills of Athens